Dacope is an upazila of Khulna District in the Division of Khulna, Bangladesh.

Geography
It has 25,377 households and a total area of 991.58 km.
With an area of 99158 km2, it is bounded by Batiaghata Upazila on the north, Pashur River on the south, Rampal and Mongla Upazilas on the east and Paikgachha and Koyra Upazilas on the west. The main rivers are Pasur, Sibsa, Manki, Bhadra. The southern part of this upazila is surrounded by Sundarban (11790.13 hectares).

Demographics
According to the 1991 Bangladesh census, Dacope had a population of 143,131. Males constituted 52.25% of the population, and females 47.75%. The population aged 18 or over was 78,759. Dacope had an average literacy rate of 37.6% (7+ years), compared to the national average of 32.4%.
It is the only Hindu majority Upazilla of Bangladesh.

Administration
The administration of Dacope thana was established in 1913 and turned into an upazila in 1983.

Dacope Upazila is divided into Dacope Municipality and ten union parishads: Bajua, Banishanta, Dakop, Koilashgonj, Kamarkhola, Khulna Range, Laudoba, Pankhali, Sutarkhali, and Tildanga. The union parishads are subdivided into 26 mauzas and 97 villages.

Dacope Municipality is subdivided into 9 wards and 15 mahallas.
There is a War of Liberation mass killing site at Bazua High School courtyard and a War of Liberation monument, Smriti Amlan (in front of the upazila parisad building).

NGO activities
Operationally important NGOs are Bangladesh Association for Sustainable Development (BASD), Asa, BRAC, Caritas, Proshika, World Vision, Gonoshahajjo Sangstha, HEED Bangladesh, Step, WorldFish, Nabolok, Rupantar and Prodipon, Society for participatory Education, Development (SPED), Paschim Bajua students welfare Association, Bajua, Dacope, Khulna and Bangladesh Environment and Development Society.

Education

Primary schools
1. Government Paschim Bajua primary school
2. Government Trimohani primary School
3. Batbunia Government Primary School
4. Government HoriMohon Primary School
5. Government Primary School, Khutakhali
6. Government Primary School, Badamtala
7. Government Primary School, Bajua
8. CMB Registered Primary School
9. Batbunia J. N. Government Primary School
10. Dakkhin Gunari Upen Ngar Government Primary School
11. Nolian Forest Government Primary School
12. Government Saleha Primary School
13. Banisanta Govt. Primary school, Banisanta.
14.Binapani Govt. Primary School, Khejuriya, Banisanta.
15.Pankhali (2) Government Primary School, Pankhali.

High schools
Paschim Kamini Basia Rashkhola High School
Paschim Bajua Secondary School
Batbunia Collegiate School
Gunari Shital Chandra High School
Abul Hosain Girls High School
Burir Dabur SESDP Model High School
Bajua Union High School
Bajua Girls High School
Bangabandhu High School
Banisanta Pinak Pani High School
Chalna Bazar Government Girls High School
Chalna K C Pilot High School
Chunkuri High School
Dacope Girl's High School
Dacope Shaheberabad Secondary School
Dakshin Gunari High School
Government Model School
J P High School
K G V J Sammilani Girls High School
Kailashganj Secondary School
Kalabagi Sundarban High School
Kalinagar G C Memorial High School
Kamini Basia G.L. High School
Khona K B Secondary School
Laksmikhola G.T. Pallimongal High School
Laudobe Badamtala High School
Loudove Banisanta High School
Mohammad Ali High School
Mozam Nagar High School
Nalian High School
Pankhali Momotajbegum Secondary School
Ramnagar Binapani High School
Shahid Smriti Junior Girls School
Sonar Bangla High School
Sreenagar High School
Sundarban Adarsha High School
Suterkhali High School
Talukdar Akhter Faruque High School
Tildanga Union Girl's High School
Trimohani High School
Yasin High School

Colleges

 Bajua Surendra Nath College, Dacope, Khulna
 Chalna College (1995), Chalna Bazar, Chalna Municipality, Dacope, Khulna
 Chalna M.M. Degree college
 Chalna Mohila Mohabidyaloy, Chalna Bazar, Dacope, Khulna
 L.B.K. Government Mohila College, Dacope, Khulna

See also
Upazilas of Bangladesh
Districts of Bangladesh
Divisions of Bangladesh

References

Upazilas of Khulna District
Khulna Division